Fierce Ruling Diva is a Dutch house music duo from Amsterdam consisting of producers Jeroen Flamman and Jeff Porter.

Biography
In the early nineties they charted three songs on the Hot Dance Music/Club Play chart, the most of successful of which was "You Gotta Believe," a #4 hit in 1992.  Ten years later that track was remixed and in 2002 it re-entered the dance chart and hit #1.

See also
List of number-one dance hits (United States)
List of artists who reached number one on the US Dance chart

References

Dutch house music groups